Pietro Rosa (November 10, 1810 in Rome – August 15, 1891 in Rome) was an Italian architect and topographer.  He studied the settlements of the ancient Roman countryside and carried out a systematic series of excavations on the Palatine Hill in Rome.

One of Rosa's ancestors was Salvator Rosa (1615-1673); Pietro was an avid patriot for the defense of the city of Rome in 1849 during the Roman Republic.

A student of Luigi Canina, Rosa was an avid scholar of Rome and Latium.  From 1861-1870 he carried out his excavations on the Palatine with the patronage of emperor Napoleon III.  He also edited the Carta topografica del Lazio, an archaeological plan that he designed between 1850 and 1870 on a scale of 1:20,000.  The map, measuring 3,40 x 3,10 m, is a unique and valuable study of the territory of Latium (modern Lazio) and the archaeological remains there.  The work was completed only in certain areas, such as the Tyrrhenian coast, Tibur and Palestrina.

Rosa was named archaeological superintendent at Rome by royal decree on March 26, 1871.  In the following years he was inspector general of antiquities in the ministry of public instruction and he was made a senator on December 1, 1870.

Further reading
 cf. L’archivio della Direzione generale delle Antichità e Belle Arti, Inventario a cura di Matteo Musacchio (Archivio Centrale dello Stato), Roma 1994, Vol. I, pp. 45–51, p. 104.
 M. A. Tomei, Scavi francesi sul Palatino, Roma 1999, pp. 1–19.
 On The Carta topografica del Lazio, see A.P. Frutaz, Le carte del Lazio, Vol. I, Roma 1972, pp. 132 –1.
 E. Gatti, "Il ritrovamento della carta archeologica del Lazio di Pietro Rosa," Bullettino della Commissione Archeologica Comunale LXXXII (1970-1971), pp. 143–145.

External links
 https://web.archive.org/web/20120717105118/http://www.archeorm.arti.beniculturali.it/ada/storia/archeologi/rosa.html
 Salvator Rosa

1810 births
1891 deaths
19th-century Italian architects
Architects from Rome
Members of the Senate of the Kingdom of Italy
Italian topographers